Bucks point is a bobbin lace from the South East of England. "Bucks" is short for Buckinghamshire, which was the main centre of production. The lace was also made in the nearby counties of Bedfordshire and Northamptonshire. Bucks point is very similar to the French Lille lace, and thus is often called English Lille. It is also similar to Mechlin lace and Chantilly lace.

Bucks point has a gimp thread outlining the pattern. It usually has Point ground or sometimes Honeycomb ground. It is made in one piece on the lace pillow, at full width and not in strips like Honiton lace. Common designs are floral and geometric. The floral designs are like those in Mechlin and Lille laces, but Bucks lace is generally simpler than the Belgian laces, and is made of linen or silk. It can have picots along the edge.

History
Although Buckinghamshire was a centre of English lacemaking from as early as the 16th century, the styles of the lace made would have varied at different periods, reflecting what was fashionable at the time. The style referred to as Bucks Point lace did not appear until the end of the 18th century. It seems to have been based on contemporary Mechlin lace, but with Mechlin ground replaced by a simpler point ground to give a lighter lace as had become popular at the time.

References

External links
Introduction to Bucks lace

Bobbin lace
Textile arts of England
Arts in Buckinghamshire